James Theophilus Grayman (born 11 October 1985) is a male high jumper from Antigua and Barbuda. He was born and raised in Parham Town by his mother Evelyn Sheppard.

His personal best jump is 2.27 metres, achieved in July 2007 in Pergine Valsugana. This is the current Antiguan and Barbudan record.

Personal bests
Outdoor
 High bump: 2.27 m NR –  Pergine Valsugana, 7 July 2007
Indoor
 High jump: 2.24 m –  Ghent, 21 February 2010

Achievements

References

External links
 
 

1985 births
Living people
Antigua and Barbuda male high jumpers
Commonwealth Games competitors for Antigua and Barbuda
Olympic athletes of Antigua and Barbuda
Athletes (track and field) at the 2006 Commonwealth Games
Athletes (track and field) at the 2007 Pan American Games
Athletes (track and field) at the 2008 Summer Olympics
Athletes (track and field) at the 2010 Commonwealth Games
Athletes (track and field) at the 2011 Pan American Games
Pan American Games bronze medalists for Antigua and Barbuda
People from Saint Peter Parish, Antigua
Pan American Games medalists in athletics (track and field)
Medalists at the 2007 Pan American Games